No Mountains in Manhattan is the debut studio album by American hip hop recording artist Wiki. It was released on August 25, 2017, by XL Recordings. It features guest verses from Ghostface Killah, Lakutis, ACAB, Slicky Boy and Your Old Droog, and production credits for Wiki, Kaytranada, Earl Sweatshirt and Sporting Life.

Critical reception

Quinn Moreland of Pitchfork commented that "No Mountains in Manhattan would be a great record even if Wiki stuck to this urban bliss, but instead he confronts the city's shadows to build a complex portrait of himself."

Accolades

Track listing

Sample Credits

 "Mayor" contains elements from "We Have Love" performed by The Arrows.
 "Made For This" contains elements from "Winter Go Away" performed by Holly Maxwell.
"Litt 15" contains elements from "Never In This World" as performed by Barrabas, written by J. Arbex Miro.
 "Jalo" contains elements from "Rose Petals" written and performed by John Klemmer.
 "Wiki New Written" contains elements from "We Had True Love" performed by Hot Chocolate.
 "Baby Girl" contains elements from "Fairy Tale Song (Cadê)" performed by Milton Nascimento.

References

External links
 

2017 debut albums
XL Recordings albums
Albums produced by Kaytranada
Albums produced by Earl Sweatshirt
Hip hop albums by American artists